Justicia Espada Acuña Mena (January 14, 1893 – 1980) was a Chilean civil engineer. Justicia was the first woman to become a civil engineer in Chile.

Biography
Justicia Acuña Mena was born in Santiago, Chile, on January 14, 1893. She was the daughter of an engineer, José Acuña Latorre. She had eight siblings. She studied at the Liceo de Aplicación and then at the Instituto Pedagógico. In 1913, she switched her studies from mathematics to civil engineering, and entered the Faculty of Physical and Mathematical Sciences of the University of Chile, being the only woman among all the students of that faculty. She graduated as a civil engineer in 1919, along with Jorge Alessandri.

In 1920, Acuña began working as a calculator in the Department of Roads and Works of the Empresa de los Ferrocarriles del Estado. During the course of her career at Empresa, she left a few times to raise her seven children, but always returned before retiring in 1954.

Acuña died in Santiago in 1980.

Recognition
In July 1980, to honor Acuña's effort for the advancement of women, the Chilean College of Engineers established the "Gallery of Illustrious Engineers", where she was included.

In 1991, the Justicia Acuña Mena Award was created; it is awarded every two years to an outstanding woman engineer in the practice of her profession.

On January 14, 2021, there was a Google Doodle to celebrate her on her birthday.

See also

 Elisa Bachofen—first Argentinian woman graduated as a civil engineer in 1918.

References

1893 births
1980 deaths
20th-century Chilean engineers
20th-century women engineers
People from Santiago
University of Chile alumni
Chilean civil engineers